James Clark Gentles FRSE (18 March 1921 – 15 November 1997) was a Scottish mycologist and the first British person to specialise in fungal disease on the human body.

Life
He was born in Coatbridge on 18 March 1921. He was the son of the manager of a steelworks. He attended school locally then went to Glasgow University studying Natural History. He graduated BSc and continued obtaining a doctorate (PhD).

In the Second World War, Gentles served in the Royal Air Force as a radar operator. He was commissioned in 1942 (aged 21) and was in command of radar equipment in the then-British colony of Burma.

In 1947, Carl Hamilton Browning head-hunted Gentles to Head his new department investigating fungal diseases of the human body at Glasgow University. He first trained him up further, organising a Distillers Company Scholarship to fund a years specialisation in mycology at Glasgow then a further year in Paris at the Pasteur Institute, followed by a course at the London School of Hygiene and Tropical Medicine. On return to Browning in Glasgow, he was appointed to the Medical Research Council, his first task being to investigate ringworm in the feet of Scottish miners. In 1976 he was given his professorship.

In 1981 he was elected a Fellow of the Royal Society of Edinburgh. His proposers were William Whigham Fletcher, William McPhee Hutchison, Sir William D. P. Stewart, John Hawthorn, Ernest Oliver Morris and John Smith.

Gentles was a keen golfer, serving as Captain of Lenzie Golf Club.

He died on 15 November 1997, aged 76.

Family
He was married to Barr Gentles. They had a son James (born in Paris) and daughter Carine.

References

1921 births
1997 deaths
Fellows of the Royal Society of Edinburgh
Alumni of the University of Glasgow
People from Coatbridge
British mycologists
Royal Air Force personnel of World War II
British people in British Burma
Royal Air Force officers